The Navy Midshipmen baseball team is a varsity intercollegiate athletic team of the United States Naval Academy in Annapolis, Maryland, United States. The team is a member of the Patriot League, which is part of the National Collegiate Athletic Association's Division I. Navy's first baseball team was fielded in 1893. The team plays its home games at Terwilliger Brothers Field at Max Bishop Stadium in Annapolis, Maryland. The Midshipmen are coached by Paul Kostacopoulos.

Major League Baseball
Navy has had 10 Major League Baseball Draft selections since the draft began in 1965.

See also
List of NCAA Division I baseball programs

References

External links

 

 
Baseball teams established in 1893
1893 establishments in Maryland